The All Red Line was a system of electrical telegraphs that linked much of the British Empire. It was inaugurated on 31 October 1902. The informal name derives from the common practice of colouring the territory of the British Empire red or pink on political maps.

Construction

The first transatlantic cable connected Ireland and Newfoundland in 1858, although it later failed. In 1866, the  laid out a lasting link from Valentia Island, in Ireland, to Heart's Content, Newfoundland.

By 1870, Suez was linked to Bombay, and from there to Madras, Penang, and Singapore. Australia was linked to British telegraph cables directly in 1871, by extending a line from Singapore to Port Darwin, although it ran through the Dutch territory of Java. By 1872, messages could be sent direct from London to Adelaide and Sydney. Australia was linked to New Zealand by cable in 1876.

To complete the All Red Line, therefore, the final major cable laying project was the trans-Pacific section. A resolution supporting such a project was passed by the First Colonial Conference in 1887 and more detailed plans were approved at the 1894 Colonial Conference in Ottawa which was called specifically on the topic of the cable project. The "Pacific Cable Committee" was formed in 1896 to consider the proposal and in 1901 the Pacific Cable Board was formed with eight members: Three from Britain, two from Canada, two from Australia and one from New Zealand. Funding for the project was shared between the British, Canadian, New Zealand, New South Wales, Victorian and Queensland governments. In 1902 the Colonia, a newly-built cable vessel, began laying the 8,000 tonnes of cable needed to complete the Bamfield, British Columbia, to Fanning Island section of the cable. The final cost was around £2 million.

Originally, the British government felt the All Red system should have sea-landings only on British-controlled soil for security purposes. Due to this, Britain actively sought to acquire Fanning Island (now Tabuaeran in Kiribati) to use for a midpoint power regeneration / relay station between Western Canada and Australia on the trans-Pacific Ocean branch of the system. Fanning Island was annexed to the British Empire in 1888.

Completion
The Committee on Imperial Defence reported in 1911 that the All Red Line was complete. The network had so many redundancies that 49 cuts would be needed to isolate the United Kingdom; 15 for Canada; and 5 for South Africa. Many colonies such as South Africa and India also had many land lines. Britain also possessed the majority of the world's underwater-telegraph deployment and repair equipment and expertise, and a monopoly of the gutta-percha insulation for underwater lines.

The 1911 report stated that the Imperial Wireless Chain should only be a "valuable reserve" to the All Red Line, because enemies could interrupt or intercept radio messages. Despite its great cost, the telegraph network succeeded in its purpose: British communications remained uninterrupted during the First World War, while Britain quickly succeeded in cutting Germany's worldwide network.

The Pacific Cable Board laid a duplicate cable between Canada and New Zealand between 1923 and 1926, using the cable-laying ships Dominia and Faraday.

Routes
Atlantic Ocean stations
 Great Britain
 Ireland
 Newfoundland
 Canada
 Saint Helena
 Ascension Island
 Barbados
 Bermuda

Pacific Ocean stations
 Bamfield, British Columbia, Canada
 Fanning Island, which was deserted until the telegraph relay station was established.
 Fiji
 Hong Kong
 Norfolk Island (branching to New Zealand and Australia)
 Southport, Queensland, Australia (the Pacific Cable Station still exists and is heritage-listed)

Indian Ocean stations
 Cape Town,  South Africa
 Durban,  South Africa
 Keeling Islands (branching to India and Africa)
 Mauritius
 Perth, Australia

Commonwealth Telegraph Agreement

In the final years of the British Empire, with a number of states federated or close to independence, a treaty with clearer financial divisions, responsibilities, and governance was established that would eventually replace the Pacific Cable Board.  A treaty Commonwealth Telegraph Agreement was signed between Commonwealth nations in London, 1948 that formed the Commonwealth Telecommunications Organisation.

See also
All-Red Route
Commonwealth Pacific Cable System
Electrical telegraphy in the United Kingdom

Footnotes

References

External links
Map of the 1902 line
A 1904 speech by Sandford Fleming on the importance of an imperial cable system.
Gentlemen of the Cable Service

British Empire
Telegraphy
Transatlantic telecommunications